The following page lists all power stations in Namibia.

Hydroelectric

Solar power

Thermal

Pictures

See also 
 List of power stations in Africa
 List of largest power stations in the world

References 

Namibia
 
Power stations